The 1954–55 Hapoel Petah Tikva season was the club's 20th season since its establishment in 1935, and 7th since the establishment of the State of Israel.

During the season, the club competed in Liga Alef (top division) and the State Cup. In addition, the team took part in a joint tour to Cyprus with Maccabi Petah Tikva.

Review and events
 On 24 September 1954, a team of players from both Hapoel Petah Tikva and Maccabi Petah Tikva departed for a tour of Cyprus, without the consent of the IFA. The Hapoel organization sent a telegram forbidding the participation of Hapoel players in any match, and the team played as Maccabi Petah Tikva. The team played against APOEL FC, AC Omonia and Çetinkaya, losing two matches and drawing one. After returning to Israel, Maccabi Petah Tikva was banned for 6 months for its part of the tour, while Hapoel Petah Tikva received a fine of 50 pounds.
 Petah Tikva XI, a team composed of players from Hapoel Petah Tikva and Maccabi Petah Tikva played three matches against visiting foreign teams: Against Beşiktaş on 20 September 1954, losing 0–2, against Udarnik Sofia on 16 October 1954, losing 2–3, and against AC Omonia on 27 May 1955, winning 4–1. Players of the club were also part of a Hapoel XI team which played Beşiktaş on 22 September 1954, winning 3–1 and Udarnik Sofia on 10 October 1954, losing 0–3.

Match Results

Legend

Liga Alef
 
League matches began on 6 February 1955, and by the time the season, only 20 rounds of matches were completed, delaying the end of the league season to the next season.

League table (as of 2 July 1955)

Source:

Matches

Results by match

State Cup

References
1955 Season Hapoel Petah Tikva Museum 

Hapoel Petah Tikva F.C. seasons
Hapoel Petah Tikva